Hector Kandy Rambelomasina (born 17 February 1981) is a retired Malagasy football goalkeeper.

References

1981 births
Living people
Malagasy footballers
Madagascar international footballers
Ecoredipharm players
Japan Actuel's FC players
Association football goalkeepers